Studying in an educational context refers to the process of gaining mastery of a certain area of information.
Study software then is any program which allows students to improve the time they spend thinking about, learning and studying that information.

More specifically study software's objective is to increase the effective application of efficacious study skills to that information, such that thinking and learning about that information is more productive per unit time.

Different subjects being studied may benefit from a different spread of study skills being applied. Mathematics requires a somewhat different set of study skills to the skill required to learn a language.

Some types of study software are subject specific teachers of material and may or may not contain the information/content that requires mastery.

Study software therefore is a blanket for a variety of overlapping software types.

Origins
Education has of course been a road to a better life and so the drive for improvement has been universal from students.
Students in most United States
and Nepal institutions are not taught how to study/learn specifically. Yet there is now hard evidence for some methods for study/learning being superior to others, and that there is benefit in teaching 'study skills' themselves.

Study software to a degree, seeks to circumvent this problem, by causing the student to follow good practices, through the use of the software, without necessarily having to know about the background science of memory and learning.

Historically the most successful types of study software include mindmapping and flashcard software programs. Both independently have been proven to improve learning. Mapping software's claimed strengths are more at the thinking end of the spectrum of study and are criticized for their lack of efficacy once the benefits of organizing information are finished. Flashcard software's strengths are more at the learning end of the spectrum of study and are criticized as being for rote learning only.

A more recently arrived group is notetaking software.

There are also hybrids of the above broad types available, including ones that can actually test students on their notes.

Benefits
Benefits that the various types of study software might confer include various mixtures of:

 Offers variety of different information together (picture, sound, music, diagram, ...)
 Improved access to variety of information - see databases
 Makes making notes efficient (tablet friendly 'Microsoft ink functionality', speech recognition)
 Notes are (made to be) easy to remember - colors, pictures, diagrams or mindmapping
 Use of hypertext to connect related information
 Testing, reviews and tracking of knowledge - 'spacing effect'

Barriers
Barriers to the use of study software include:

 Requires hardware, and in some cases electronic access to the content, and neither might be available.
 Some level of skill may be needed to use the hardware required by the software. Learning may be delayed by the need of skills such as typing, using a mouse, pointing on a touch-sensitive screen, or other skills required to handle the hardware.
 Costs of hardware, software, and salaries, combined with low budgets in some schools, may limit the availability and usefulness for the study resources.
 Programs don't communicate together as they could (see Unix philosophy). Self-contained programs either don't offer enough features (e.g. calculation of the spacing effect to learn faster) or offer more than they should (Software bloat).
 Content might differ significantly in different countries.

Future
A number of converging trends make it extremely likely that study software will become ubiquitous within 10 years.

Supply of the enabling technologies will improve.

Trends include: Improvements in battery technology, head worn sound and visual displays, input devices, speech recognition, handwriting recognition will allow mobile computing to become the norm. There are no more 'basic breakthroughs' needed in any of these areas before wearable computers become a given in the near future.
Broadband access, especially wireless will mean that the normal state of affairs for a student will be to be online at a moment's notice.
Ultimately the computer will be a constantly worn companion for a typical student.

Demand for the service will increase.

With physical goods becoming cheaper, and less labour-intensive, increasing emphasis on 'services' as a valuable labor commodity throughout the world will mean that higher and higher levels of education, with increased competition for places, will require improvements in learning efficiency that can only be brought about through the application of specialized study software to the problem.

See also
Computer-assisted language learning
Flashcard
Forgetting curve
Free recall
List of concept- and mind-mapping software
List of flashcard software
Memory
Mind map
Notetaking
Spaced repetition
Spacing effect

References
Burdess, N. (1998). Handbook of student skills. (2nd ed.). Sydney: Prentice Hall
Farrand, P, Hussain, F, Hennessy, E (2002) "The efficacy of the 'mind map' study technique". Medical Education. 36 (issue5) p426-
Glenberg A.M. (1977) "Influences or the retrieval processes on the spacing effect in free recall". Journal of Experimental Psychology 3: 282-294
Hilliary F.G et al. (2003) "Spacing of Repetitions Improves Learning and Memory After Moderate and Severe TBI". Journal of Clinical and Experimental NeuroPsychology 25(1): 49-58 (as above internet link)
Hintzman D.L. (1974) "Theoretical implications of the spacing effect". In Theories in cognitive psychology: The Loyola Symposium (Ed.R.L. Solso), p. 77-99
Toppino T.C, Kasserman J.E., Mracek W.A (1991) "The effect of Spacing Repetitions on the Recognition Memory of Young Children and Adults". Journal of Experimental Child Psychology 51: 123-138
Withers, G. (1991). Tackling that test: Everything you wanted to know about taking tests and exams''. Hawthorn, Vic.: Australian Council for Educational Research.
Mawonedzo, TK  "make sure u mind is not somewhere else before you start studying"

Educational technology
Educational software